The Cameo (French: Le camée) is a 1913 French silent drama film directed by Maurice Tourneur and starring Emmy Lynn, Henry Roussel and Alexandre Arquillière.

References

Bibliography
 Waldman, Harry. Maurice Tourneur: The Life and Films. McFarland, 2001.

External links

1913 films
Films directed by Maurice Tourneur
French silent films
1913 drama films
French drama films
French black-and-white films
Silent drama films
1910s French films